The Women’s European Boxing Championships was hosted and organised by the Dutch Boxing Association in the Netherlands in 2011. The event was held in the ‘Topsportcentrum Rotterdam’ in the Netherlands from 16 to 23 October 2011.

It was the first time in the Dutch Boxing Association’s 100-year history that they hosted such an international event. The tournament was organised in association with the European Boxing Confederation (EUBC).

Contestants
The organisers of the event expected to welcome between 300 and 400 women boxers, competing in 10 different weight classes.

Medal table

Medal winners

External links 
Official Results

Women's European Amateur Boxing Championships
European Amateur Boxing Championships
International sports competitions hosted by the Netherlands
Sports competitions in Rotterdam
European
Women's European Amateur Boxing Championships
Women's European Amateur Boxing Championships, 2011